Didier Gomes Da Rosa (born 10 October 1969) is a French football manager and former player. He is the current manager of Saudi Arabian club Al-Ain FC. He is famous for making an impressive impact in all the clubs he has managed in his early years in the African continent winning the league titles with Rayon Sports F.C. (2013), Coton Sport FC de Garoua (2014 and 2015) and also the Cameroonian Cup at the Garoua-based club.

Managerial career

France
Didier Gomes Da Rosa began his managerial career in 2008 in his home country France and managed AS Roquebrune Cap Martin, ES Fos sur Mer and AS Cannes in the League of the Mediterranean until 2011.

Rayon Sports
He first moved out of France in 2012 to Africa and more accurately to Rwanda where he was appointed as the manager of Rwandan giants, Rayon Sports F.C. on a three-year contract. The club, nicknamed "Gikundiro" (the well-beloved), because of its popularity was in the relegation zone of the Rwanda National Football League after a disastrous start in the championship falling ten points short of league leaders and the club's arch rivals, Armée Patriotique Rwandaise F.C. Under the Frenchman's leadership, the Nyanza-based side made a spectacular comeback in the season which will be remembered by Rwandan football fans for the years to come. Seven months later, the Gikundiro thrashed rivals APR 4–0 in a historic win and were crowned the champions of the 2012–13 Rwanda National Football League. He also helped his side win the Genocide Memorial Tournament in 2013 where his side faced La Jeunesse Football Club in the finals. His side also participated 2013 Kagame Interclub Cup but unfortunately lost 1–0 to Burundi's Vital'O FC in the semi-finals. The club after facing serious financial deficits parted ways with the French manager on a mutual consent.

Coton Sport
He then moved to Cameroon in December 2013 where he signed a two-year contract with Cameroonian giants, Coton Sport FC de Garoua. Appointed as the General Manager as well as the head coach, his task was to prepare the team for the Elite One, Cameroonian Cup and also the CAF Confederation Cup. Soon the Frenchman led his side to championship glory as his side led the league table with more than a ten points. He also helped his young side win the 2014 Cameroonian Cup. He led his team to the semi-finals of the 2014 CAF Confederation Cup where they bowed out to African giants and the eventual champions of the tournament, Al Ahly SC of Egypt. In the following season, despite a six-point penalty, he managed to lead his young side to win the 2015 Elite One.

CS Constantine
Declining the proposal of renewing his contract with the Cameroonian champions, the Frenchman decided to move to Algeria where he committed himself to a contract for two-years with Constantine-based, CS Constantine when the side was in the relegation zone just twelve days into the championship. He rescued the Algerian side from relegation in the 2015–16 Algerian Ligue Professionnelle 1 and his side was also adjudged the third best side in the second round of the championship.

Horoya
Didier Gomes became Horoya AC manager in March 2019 and lead the Guinea giant to won the Guinean league and won the Guinean cup. Meantime, Gomes reached the CAF Confederation group stage after knocked out Bandari FC Kenya side. On 10 November 2019, following some misunderstanding between Gomes and Horoya president they mutually parted ways.

Ismaily SC
He became Ismaily SC manager on 8 January 2020, Didier Gomes lead Ismaily to reach the semi final of the Arab Champions league and won the first leg match against al raja club 1-0 and then the Arab federation stop the cup cause of COVID-9 pandemic. On 25 August 2020 Didier Gomes was sacked by Ismaily. Ismaily stated the reasons of dismissal due to poor results after draw two matches after the resuming of the Egyptian league.

Al-Merrikh SC
On 14 November 2020, Didier Gomes was appointed as new head coach for the Sudanese giant Al-Al-Merrikh SC. On 24 November he took charge of the first match in the preliminary round of CAF champions league 2020–21 against the Congolese side Otoho. He achieved a draw 1–1 in Congo, and win against Otoho 2–0 in the second leg match to qualify to round 32. In round 32 he knocked out the giant enyimba Nigerian side after won 3–0 in first leg match and lose 2–1 in second leg match to lead the Al-Al-Merrikh to qualify to the CAF champions league for the first time in 4 seasons. Meantime, Gomes lead Al-Merrikh to lead the Sudanese premier league table with 6 points difference from the second position. on 22 January 2021 Gomes resigned as the head coach of Al-Merrikh to take charge of Simba SC The Tanzanian Giant.

Simba S.C.
On 24 January 2021, the Tanzanian giant Simba SC appoint Didier Gomes as the new head coach, after terminated his contract with Al-Merrikh SC. the club announce the main target this season is to reach the quarter final of the African champions league and win the Tanzanian league. in 6 matches in the African champions league group, Simba achieved 13 points after won 4 matches, draw 1 and lost 1 match to take lead of the group and qualify to the quarter final. Didier Gomes created a new record by his name with Simba after achieved 13 points in the group stage to be the first Tanzanian club to reach this number of points. Also, won the first match ever for any Tanzanian club in away match in any African trophies in the group stage; as they won 1–0 against the Congolese side vita club.

After leading Simba in 37 games, in which he won 27, draw 5 and lose 5 and won two titles, on 26 October 2021, Simba announced  that Didier Gomes has resigned in a mutual agreement.

This came just few days after Simba was knocked out of CAF Champions League after they threw away a 2–0 lead from the first leg to lose 3–1 at home against Botswana debutants Jwaneng Galaxy and crush out of the competition.

Simba were eliminated on the away goal rule after a 3-3 aggregate result and are now have to contend in the CAF Confederation Cup play-off round.

Al-Wehdat SC 
On 1 June 2022, Didier Gomes was appointed as the new head coach of the Jordan giant Al wehdat, he take charge of the team when the team was in the 6th position. However, he achieved the 2nd position in the Jordan league with one point less than the champions. Meanwhile, he won the Jordan cup with Al Wehdat for the first time since 2013 to lead them to the AFC Champions league 2023

Al-Ain FC 
On 17 November 2022, Gomes was appointed as the manager of Saudi Arabian club Al-Ain FC.

Personal life
Born in France, Gomes Da Rosa is of Portuguese descent.

Managerial statistics

Honours
Rayon Sports F.C.
Kagame Interclub Cup: 2013
Rwanda Premier League: 2012–13 
Coton Sport FC de Garoua
Elite One: 2014, 2015
Cameroonian Cup: Cameroonian Cup
Ethiopian Coffee S.C.
Addis Ababa City Cup: 2018
Horoya AC
Guinée Championnat National: 2018–19
Guinée Coupe Nationale: 2019
Ismaily SC
Arab Club Champions Cup: Semi Finals 2019-20
Al-Merrikh SC
Sudan Premier League: 2020–21
Simba S.C.
Tanzanian Premier League: 2020-21
Tanzania FA Cup: 2020-21 
Al-Wehdat SC
Jordan FA Cup: Winner 2022
Jordanian Pro League: Runner up 2022

Personal achievements
Award Best Coach in Tanzania 2020-2021
Award 4th Best Coach in Africa 2020-2021 "Ghana Sports Magazine" 
Award Best Coach in Sudan November and December 2020
Award Best Coach in Cameroon 2014
3rd Best French Coach in Africa – Zarpa Awards 2015

References

External links

Didier Gomes Da Rosa – EUROSPORT

1969 births
Living people
French football managers
Coton Sport FC de Garoua managers
CS Constantine managers
JSM Skikda managers
Horoya AC managers
Ismaily SC managers
Al-Merrikh SC managers
Simba S.C. managers
Al-Ain FC (Saudi Arabia) managers
Ethiopian Premier League managers
Egyptian Premier League managers
Saudi First Division League managers
Expatriate football managers in Algeria
French expatriate sportspeople in Algeria
Expatriate football managers in Cameroon
French expatriate sportspeople in Cameroon
Expatriate football managers in Egypt
French expatriate sportspeople in Egypt
Expatriate football managers in Ethiopia
French expatriate sportspeople in Ethiopia
Expatriate football managers in Guinea
French expatriate sportspeople in Guinea
French expatriate sportspeople in Mauritania
Expatriate football managers in Mauritania
Expatriate football managers in Rwanda
French expatriate sportspeople in Rwanda
Expatriate football managers in Saudi Arabia
French expatriate sportspeople in Saudi Arabia
Expatriate football managers in Sudan
French expatriate sportspeople in Sudan
Expatriate football managers in Tanzania
French expatriate sportspeople in Tanzania
Algerian Ligue Professionnelle 1 managers
Mauritania national football team managers
French people of Portuguese descent